APTonCD is a tool that can back up software packages (.deb files) downloaded via Advanced Packaging Tool (APT) or aptitude, creating a repository that can be used to install those packages on other computers without Internet access. APTonCD gathers the collected packages into a single ISO image. A third-party optical disc authoring tool can subsequently write the ISO image to a disc.

Limitations
Since APTonCD just copies the deb files on the cache, it will not save files that are downloaded when the .deb packages are installed, this causes packages like "ubuntu-restricted-extras" or the Flash plugin to fail when installing them on a computer with no internet access.

References

External links 

Linux package management-related software